Sita Air is an airline based in Kathmandu, Nepal, operating domestic services within Nepal. The airline was established in 2003. The airline's main base is Tribhuvan International Airport with hubs at Pokhara Airport and Nepalgunj Airport.

History 

The airline received its air operators certificate in 2000, and was established in October 2000, but was unable to operate until 2003 due to political unrest in Nepal. Operations started on 6 February 2003 with a single Dornier 228; a second aircraft was added in April 2003.

In August 2014, the Civil Aviation Authority of Nepal barred the airline from carrying passengers due to safety concerns and failing to meet international standards. The airline was allowed to continue operating cargo flights. However, by 2016, the airline was allowed to operate passenger services again.

In 2016, the airline was sold to Biratnagar-based Agrawal Group for NPRs 550,000,000.

In 2017, Sita Air bought two more Dornier 228 aircraft from Simrik Airlines.

Destinations 
Sita Air currently operates services to the following domestic destinations (as of May 2019):

Fleet 
The Sita Air fleet consists of the following aircraft (as of May 2019):

Accidents and incidents

 On 30 September 2004, a Sita Air Dornier 228 crashlanded at Lukla Airport, causing the airport to be closed for several days.
 On 12 October 2010, a Sita Air Dornier 228 hit a wall beside the runway in Lukla Airport as its brake system did not work properly. The engine inlet of the aircraft was damaged heavily. The aircraft was attempting to land at Lukla airport. It was lifted by helicopter to Kathmandu for repairs and put back to service. This same aircraft went on to have another crash landing accident on Simkot Airport in 2013.
 On 28 September 2012, Sita Air Flight 601, a Dornier 228 crashed just after takeoff from Tribhuvan International Airport. All 16 passengers and 3 crew on board were killed. The flight was bound for Lukla. An investigation report into the crash concluded that it was caused by passenger and cargo payload that exceeded the aircraft's maximum takeoff weight.
 On 1 June 2013, a Sita Air Dornier 228 sustained substantial damage upon landing accident at Simikot Airport. There were no injuries among the five passengers and two crew members. The left hand main landing gear broke and the Dornier 228 came to rest on the side of the runway. The no. 1 propeller, left hand wing and underside of the fuselage sustained substantial damage. The aircraft had to be airlifted to Kathmandu by a helicopter.
 23 April 2017 – Sita Air Flight  617, a Dornier 228 met a minor incident at Phaplu Airport. The wing tip of theaircraft of was damaged as the aircraft hit the wall on the apron at Phaplu Airport.

 On 20 February 2018, Sita Air Flight 601, a Dornier 228 was forced to make an emergency diversion after the aircraft experienced abnormal pressure reading on the engine during the flight to Lukla from Kathmandu which forced the flight crew to carry out the precautionary engine shut down procedure; Shutting down the right engine.

On August 11 2021, a Sita Air Dornier 228 punctured a tire at Simkot Airport while landing. No injures were reported. Only crew were onboard transporting Cargo.

Notes

References

External links 

Airlines banned in the European Union
Airlines of Nepal
Airlines established in 2003
2000 establishments in Nepal